Events in the year 2011 in Brazil.

Incumbents

Federal government
 President: Dilma Rousseff 
 Vice President: Michel Temer

Governors
 Acre: Binho Marques (until 1 January), Tião Viana (starting 1 January)
 Alagoas: Teotônio Vilela Filho
 Amapa: Camilo Capiberibe (starting 1 January)
 Amazonas: Omar Aziz
 Bahia: Jaques Wagner
 Ceará: Cid Gomes
 Espírito Santo: Paulo Hartung
 Goiás: Alcides Rodrigues (until 1 January), Marconi Perillo (starting 1 January)
 Maranhão: Roseana Sarney
 Mato Grosso: Silval da Cunha
 Mato Grosso do Sul: André Puccinelli
 Minas Gerais: Antônio Anastasia
 Pará: Ana Júlia Carepa (until 1 January), Simão Jatene (starting 1 January)
 Paraíba: Ricardo Coutinho
 Paraná: Orlando Pessuti (until 1 January), Beto Richa (starting 1 January)
 Pernambuco: Eduardo Campos
 Piauí: Wilson Martins 
 Rio de Janeiro: Sérgio Cabral Filho
 Rio Grande do Norte: Iberê Paiva Ferreira de Souza (until 1 January), Rosalba Ciarlini Rosado (starting 1 January)
 Rio Grande do Sul: Yeda Rorato Crusius (until 1 January), Tarso Genro (starting 1 January)
 Rondônia: João Aparecido Cahulla (until 1 January), Confúcio Moura (starting 1 January)
 Roraima: José de Anchieta Júnior
 Santa Catarina: Leonel Pavan (until 1 January), Raimundo Colombo (starting 1 January)
 São Paulo: Alberto Goldman (until 1 January), Geraldo Alckmin (starting 1 January)
 Sergipe: Marcelo Déda
 Tocantins: Carlos Henrique Gaguim (until 1 January), José Wilson Siqueira Campos (starting 1 January)

Vice governors
 Acre:	Carlos César Correia de Messias
 Alagoas: José Wanderley Neto (until 1 January), José Thomaz da Silva Nonô Neto (starting 1 January)
 Amapá: Pedro Paulo Dias de Carvalho (until 1 January), Doralice Nascimento de Souza (starting 1 January)
 Amazonas: Omar José Abdel Aziz (until 1 January), José Melo de Oliveira (starting 1 January)
 Bahia: Edmundo Pereira Santos (until 1 January), Otto Alencar (starting 1 January)
 Ceará: Francisco José Pinheiro (until 1 January), Domingos Gomes de Aguiar Filho (starting 1 January)
 Espírito Santo: Ricardo de Rezende Ferraço (until 1 January), Givaldo Vieira da Silva (starting 1 January)
 Goiás: Ademir de Oliveira Meneses (until 1 January), José Eliton de Figueiredo Júnior (starting 1 January)
 Maranhão: João Alberto Souza (until 1 January), Joaquim Washington Luiz de Oliveira (starting 1 January)
 Mato Grosso: Silval da Cunha Barbosa (until 1 January), Francisco Tarquínio Daltro (starting 1 January)
 Mato Grosso do Sul: Murilo Zauith (until 1 January), Simone Tebet (starting 1 January)
 Minas Gerais: Antonio Augusto Junho Anastasia (until 1 January), Alberto Pinto Coelho Júnior (starting 1 January)
 Pará: Odair Santos Corrêa (until 1 January), Helenilson Cunha Pontes (starting 1 January)
 Paraíba: Luciano Cartaxo Pires de Sá (until 1 January), Rômulo José de Gouveia (starting 1 January)
 Paraná: Orlando Pessuti (until 1 January), Flávio José Arns (starting 1 January)
 Pernambuco: João Soares Lyra Neto
 Piauí: Antônio José de Moraes Souza Filho
 Rio de Janeiro: Luiz Fernando Pezão
 Rio Grande do Norte: Robinson Faria (starting 1 January)
 Rio Grande do Sul: Paulo Afonso Girardi Feijó (until 1 January), Jorge Alberto Duarte Grill (starting 1 January)
 Rondônia: Airton Pedro Gurgacz (starting 1 January)
 Roraima: Francisco de Assis Rodrigues (starting 1 January)
 Santa Catarina: Eduardo Pinho Moreira
 São Paulo: Guilherme Afif Domingos (starting 1 January)
 Sergipe: Belivaldo Chagas Silva (until 1 January), Jackson Barreto (starting 1 January)
 Tocantins: Eduardo Machado Silva (until 1 January) João Oliveira de Sousa (starting 1 January)

Events

January 1 - Inauguration of Dilma Rousseff as the 36th President of Brazil). 
January 11 - January 2011 Rio de Janeiro floods and mudslides: Over 900 people are killed as a result of freak weather conditions. 
April 7 - Rio de Janeiro school shooting: 12 children aged between 12 and 14 are killed and 22 others seriously wounded after an armed man opens fire at an elementary school in Realengo  
July 13 - Noar Linhas Aéreas Flight 4896: A Noar Linhas Aéreas Let L-410 Turbolet crashes in Boa Viagem, Recife, killing all 16 people on board).
July 23 - Miss Brasil 2011 
September 12 - Miss Universe 2011 held at the Credicard Hall in São Paulo. 
November 7 - Campos Basin oil spill: A Chevron-owned oil well began leaking causing  of crude oil to enter the ocean every day.

Founded
 Baby.com.br
 BemSimples (discontinued 2014)

Football clubs

 Conilon Futebol Clube de Jaguaré, Galvez Esporte Clube, Esporte Clube Iranduba da Amazônia, Sabiá Futebol Clube, Serra Talhada Futebol Clube.

Sport

Football

 2011 in Brazilian football 
 Santos FC lose the 2011 FIFA Club World Cup Final to FC Barcelona (0-4).

Tennis

 2011 Brasil Open 
 2011 São Léo Open 
 2011 ATP Challenger Tour Finals 
 2011 Tetra Pak Tennis Cup

Volleyball

 2011 FIVB Volleyball Men's U21 World Championship
 2011 Men's South American Volleyball Championship 
 2011 Women's South American Volleyball Club Championship

Racing

 2011 Brazilian Grand Prix
 2011 Formula 3 Brazil Open
 2011 São Paulo Indy 300
 2011 Desafio Internacional das Estrelas
 2011 FIA WTCC Race of Brazil
 2011 Formula 3 Sudamericana season
 2011 GT Brasil season
 2011 Formula Future Fiat season
 2011 Fórmula Truck season
 2011 Copa Chevrolet Montana season
 2011 Brasileiro de Marcas season
 2011 Stock Car Brasil season
 2011 Trofeo Linea Brasil season

Rugby
 2011 CONSUR Sevens
 2011 South American Rugby Championship "A"

Handball

 2011 Pan American Women's Handball Championship
 2011 World Women's Handball Championship

Misc

 2011 Brazil Masters
 UFC 134
 2011 Military World Games held in Rio de Janeiro.
 Brazil at the 2011 Pan American Games
 Brazil at the 2011 World Aquatics Championships 
 Brazil at the 2011 Summer Universiade 
 Brazil at the 2011 Winter Universiade 
 Brazil at the 2011 World Championships in Athletics

Film

 List of Brazilian films of 2011

Music

 RPM reunite. 
 May 2: Exxótica stop performing.

Television

Launched

 Agora é Tarde
 A Mulher Invisível
 A Vida da Gente
 Amor e Revolução
 Aquele Beijo
 Brilhante F.C.
 Cordel Encantado
 Fina Estampa
 Insensato Coração
 Morde & Assopra
 O Astro
 Rebelde
 Se Ela Dança, Eu Danço
 Trunk Train
 Vidas em Jogo

Ended

 Anabel
 Cordel Encantado
 Fudêncio e Seus Amigos
 Hipertensão
 Insensato Coração
 Morde & Assopra
 O Astro
 Passione (telenovela)
 Ribeirão do Tempo
 Show do Tom
 The Buzz

See also 
2011 in Brazilian football

References

 
2010s in Brazil
Years of the 21st century in Brazil
Brazil
Brazil